Savage & Dugan was a Philadelphia shipping and underwriting company.

Savage and Dugan operated ships ranging from Philadelphia to Porto Rico, with a wide range of cargo needed in the early 19th century. As businessmen, they invested in the early unsuccessful Philideliphia-based National Bank.

The firm was operated by John Savage and Joseph Dugan. John Savage was born in Kingston Jamaica and was the son of William Savage and Jane Cooper (Demctris), marrying Jane Allen White. Savage started business in Philadelphia as a grocer in 1791 with a shop on 324 South Front Street. In 1794 he had an established underwriter and merchant business. The practice of the time was for multiple companies to insure a fraction of a ship's value. Savage & Dugan started with the ship "Nancy" with nine other underwriters in 1794. By 1797 the company was creating policies on entire ships with fees as high as 7.5% percent of the value of the ship charged per trip from Philadelphia to Les Cayes, noting the hazard of sea travel at the time.  By 1803 Savage had founded the Philadelphia Insurance Company. Philadelphia sailor Commodore Joshua Barney and his son-in law Nathaniel F. Williams named the town of Savage, Maryland after John Savage. Barney's son-in law Cumberland Dugan Barney was named after Joeseph Dugan. Joseph Dugan became a director in the Bank of the United States in 1816, which John Savage regularly purchased stock from. He retired to 10 Portico Square in Philadelphia.

John Savage's son John Savage Jr. retired to a house on the Northwest corner of Eleventh and Spruce by 1846, with a net worth of $200,000. His niece married into the Pleasonton family. 
Augustus J. Pleasonton succeeded the partners, followed by Frank S. Pleasonton

On 25 March 1799, the brig Liveley sailed out of Philadelphia en route to Porto Rico captained by Micheal Alcorn. It was captured by the French privateer L'Alliance captained by Dupuy on 15 April 1799. The ship was condemned in Basseterre, Guadeloupe with a total loss of cargo which consisted of flour, copper, stills, lard, soap, candles, onions, cheese, oil, razor strops, and bags. A court case claimed the brig had a commission from the President to capture French armed vessels. The ship was insured for $7,000 and John Caldwalader Jr, and Frank S. Pleasonton, heirs to Savage and Dugan sued France for the amount in 1909, over 100 years after the incident.

The same year, the 209 ton cargo ship Stranger owned by Cornelius Coolridge was captured by the French with Savage & Dugan cargo lost.

In 1803 they had offices at 91 South Third Street and by 1806 they were located at Compting House at York Court.



Ships

References

Bibliography

External links
Savage & Dugan documents (1808)

History of Philadelphia